Di Meola Plays Piazzolla is an album by Al Di Meola which is a tribute to Argentinian composer Ástor Piazzolla. Eight of the ten songs were written by Piazzolla. Di Meola is accompanied by percussionist Arto Tuncboyacian and  Dino Saluzzi, who plays bandoneon. Vince Mendoza provided some of the string arrangements.

Track listing
All songs by Ástor Piazzolla except where noted.

"Oblivión"  – 6:01
"Café 1930"  – 6:13
"Tango Suite, Pt. I"  – 8:49
"Tango Suite, Pt. III"  – 8:50
"Verano Reflections" (Piazzolla, Di Meola)  – 4:10
"Night Club 1960"  – 5:44
"Tango II"  – 5:33
"Bordel 1900"  – 4:30
"Milonga del Angel"  – 3:44
"Last Tango for Astor" (Di Meola)  – 6:20

Personnel 
 Al Di Meola – guitars, pandean pipe, vocals, percussion, arrangements
 Hernan Romero – piano, keyboards, charango, vocals
 Dino Saluzzi – bandoneon
 Chris Carrington – guitars
 Arto Tunçboyacıyan – percussion, vocals
 Gumbi Ortiz – percussion, conga
 Vince Mendoza – string arrangements

References

1996 albums
Al Di Meola albums
Atlantic Records albums